The 2011 North Hertfordshire Council election was held on 5 May 2011, at the same time as other local elections across England and Northern Ireland. Of the 49 seats on North Hertfordshire District Council, 16 were up for election.

The Conservatives gained Chesfield ward from the Liberal Democrats, but no other seats changed party at this election. The Conservatives therefore increased their majority on the council and their leader, Lynda Needham, remained leader of the council.

Overall results
The overall results were as follows:

Ward results
The results for each ward were as follows. Where the previous incumbent was standing for re-election they are marked with an asterisk(*).

References

2011 English local elections
2011